Sivakavi is a 1943 Indian Tamil-language film directed, initially, by P. K. Raja Sandow and later, S. M. Sriramulu Naidu. It starred M. K. Thyagaraja Bhagavathar, S. Jayalakshmi, Serukalathur Sama, Thirupurambal, T. R. Rajakumari, N. S. Krishnan and T. A. Mathuram. The film's screenplay was written by Thiru Muruga Kirubanandha Variyar. The film was shot at Central Studios and released by Pakshiraja Films in Coimbatore. The film was released on 10 April 1943.

Plot

Cast 

Male cast
 M. K. Thyagaraja Bhagavathar as Sivakavi
 Serukalathur Sama as Cheenakkan
 P. B. Rangachari as Independent Bandyman
 V. Sundarama Iyer as Pedagogue
 D. Balasubramaniam as Chozha Natarajan
 S. Rajam as Old Man, Boy, Hunter
 N. S. Krishnan as Saravana Muthu
 Nat Annaji Rao as Kalingaraya Prabhu
 Vasudeva Pillai as Sambantham Pillai
 Master Sethuraman as Murugan
 Ramaiah Shastri as Chozha's scholar
 Sundara Bhagavathar as Chozha's scholar
 Pulimootai Ramasamy as Saravana Muthu's friend

Female cast
 S. Jayalakshmi as Amrithavalli (Sivakavi's wife)
 M. S. Thirupurambal as Valli (Cheenakkan's wife)
 T. R. Rajakumari as Vanji
 T. A. Mathuram as Yogambal
 D. Kappalakshmi as Dasi
 K. R. Rayalakshmi as Dasi
 Pushpakanthammal as Dasi
 Kannapani Bai as Dasi
 C. K. Saraswathi as Amrithavalli's friend

Production 
Principal photography began in 1942 with P. K. Raja Sandow as the director. But soon afterwards, there were disputes between him and the producer S. M. Sriramulu Naidu. With the progress of the filming, the disagreement between the two reached such high proportions that eventually, Sriramulu Naidu dismissed Raja Sandow and took over the reins himself. The script for the film was written by Elangovan.

T. R. Rajakumari, in one of her early roles, plays a court dancer or devadasi who falls in love with M. K. Thyagaraja Bhagavathar. S. Jayalakshmi who was married at that time played the character of Amrithavalli. Her brother S. Rajam played the role of Lord Muruga. Her father Sundaram Iyer played the role of a teacher of young Srikavi in sequences with N. S. Krishnan and others.

Soundtrack 
The soundtrack of the film consisted of 29 songs were composed by Papanasam Sivan who also penned the lyrics for all songs while G. Ramanthan took care of orchestration. Sivan originally penned the song "Vadaname Chandra Bhimbamo" as "Mugam Adhu Chandra Bimbamo". When M. K. Thyagaraja Bhagavathar pointed out to Sivan how "Mugam Adhu" sounded like "Muhammad", Sivan changed it to "Vadaname". The song "Soppana Vazhvil" was based on Vijayanagari raga which resembles Sivaranjini raga. The song "Amba Manam" is based on Pantuvarali raga. The song "Vallalai Paadum" is based on Senchuruti raga. The song "Vasantharuthu" is based on Vasantha raga. The song "Kavalayai" is based on Natakurinji raga. The song "Vadhaname" is based on Sindhubairavi raga. The song "Ellam Sivan Seyal" is based on Thodi raga. The song "Manam Kanidhe " is based on Rathipatipriya raga.

The soundtrack was well received with the songs particularly "Soppana Vazhvil" and "Vadanamae" were well received. G. Dhananjayan said in his book Pride of Tamil Cinema that the songs contributed to the film's success. According to critic Randor Guy, the film is remembered for its scintillating songs mostly rendered by Thyagaraja Bhagavathar. Singer Charulatha Mani wrote for The Hindu on the song "Vallalai" that, "M.K. Thyagaraja Bhagavathar’s voice is at its pliable best in this piece, and challenging sangatis flow unfettered, like liquid gold". For the song "Vadhaname", she said "the complete octave is explored with splendid vocalisation in ‘...Madura Gaanamo...’, in lightning speed".

Release 
Sivakavi was released on 10 April 1943. The film was a major success and ran for a prolonged period even in non-Tamil speaking areas in the Madras Presidency.

References

Bibliography

External links 

 

1940s Tamil-language films
1943 films
Films scored by Papanasam Sivan
Indian black-and-white films
Films directed by S. M. Sriramulu Naidu